Julie Graham (born 24 July 1965) is a Scottish television and film actress.

Career
Graham has appeared in the Channel 4 Blood Red Roses (1986, filmed in East Kilbride). She also appeared in 1986 in an episode of Taggart, “Death Call”, as Kathleen Kelly....BBC TV series The Houseman's Tale (1987). She has also had roles as Alison McGrellis in Casualty (1988–1989), Alice in Harry (1993–1995), Alison McIntyre in Life Support (1999), Lisa Kennedy in The Bill (2010), Megan Hartnoll in At Home with the Braithwaites (2000–2003), Alona Cunningham in Between the Sheets (2003), and Mary Gilcrest in William and Mary (2003–2005).

Her film credits include The Fruit Machine (1988), Silent Scream (1990), Nuns on the Run (1990), The Big Man (1990), The Near Room (1995), Preaching to the Perverted (1997), Bedrooms and Hallways (1998), and Some Voices (2000). In 1991, she starred in the short film Rosebud with UK painter Sadie Lee.

She also appeared as Rosie in the Leave It All Behind series of British television commercials for the Peugeot 106 car, alongside Annie Dunkley and Michael McKell in the mid-1990s.

In 2006 she appeared in episode 2 of Sharman as Kylie/Patricia.

In 2007, she appeared as Donna Doig in the three-part ITV drama series Mobile. In 2008, she played the role of Dr Gillian Magwilde, an archaeologist, in the BBC television drama Bonekickers. She then starred in the BBC drama Survivors as Abby Grant. In 2010, she took on the role of Commander Lisa Kennedy in a seven-episode story arc of The Bill, as well as guest-starring in the final story of the fourth series of the Doctor Who spinoff show The Sarah Jane Adventures, playing the villainous alien Ruby White in the story Goodbye, Sarah Jane Smith. In 2008, The Times described Graham as "the small screen's resident raver, a one-woman festival of naturism". She also appeared as Maggie Reid in the fifth series of the popular ITV drama Doc Martin aired in the autumn of 2011. She portrayed Jean in the 2012 series The Bletchley Circle.

In 2011, Graham starred in the one-off BBC Christmas show Lapland, a role which she returned to for a series titled Being Eileen airing from February 2013.

In 2012, Graham appeared in the film Tower Block.

Graham appeared in a two-part Midsomer Murders episode in 2013, Season 15:E5, The Sicilian Defense, playing Dr. Laura Parr.

In 2013, Graham appeared in episode 8 of series two of the BBC series Death in Paradise.

From 2014 to 2022, Graham appeared in the recurring role of Rhona Kelly, the procurator fiscal, in the Scottish television crime drama, Shetland made by ITV Studios for the BBC.

In 2016, Graham began portraying Sheron Dawson in ITV sitcom Benidorm.

In 2020, Graham portrayed Ravio in the Doctor Who episodes "Ascension of the Cybermen" and "The Timeless Children".

Theatre

In 2000 she appeared in Dusty Hughes' Helpless at the Donmar Warehouse.

Personal life
Graham was married to actor Joseph A. Bennett from 2002 until he killed himself on 13 April 2015. On 5 February 2004 she gave birth to a daughter, Edie May, six weeks prematurely. On 3 March 2006, she gave birth to a second daughter at home  named Cyd Betty.

On 11 October 2019, Graham married Belgian skydiving instructor Davy Croket.

Filmography

References

External links
 

1965 births
People educated at Irvine Royal Academy
Living people
People from Irvine, North Ayrshire
Scottish film actresses
Scottish television actresses